Eloi Meulenberg (22 September 1912 – 26 February 1989) was a Belgian professional road bicycle racer. He is most well-known for his gold medal in the Elite Race of the 1937 Road World Championships and his 9-stage wins in the Tour de France.

Major results

1935
Grand Prix de Fourmies
1936
Paris–Brussels
Tour de France
 Winner Stages 6 and 18a
1937
  World Road Race Champion
Liège–Bastogne–Liège
Tour de France:
Winner Stages 11a, 13b, 14a & 14c,
1938
Tour de France:
Winner stages 4a, 4b & 5,
1939
Nancy-Les Vosges-Nancy
1943
Scheldeprijs
GP Jordens
GP d'Ougrée
GP Brussels
1945
Ronde van Limburg
GP de la Victoire

External links
 

1912 births
1989 deaths
Belgian male cyclists
Belgian Tour de France stage winners
UCI Road World Champions (elite men)
Sportspeople from Charleroi
Cyclists from Hainaut (province)